Sir Probyn Ellsworth Inniss MBE (18 November 1936 – 12 March 2017) was the Governor of Saint Christopher-Nevis-Anguilla from 1975 to 1980, and then, following the separation of Anguilla, the Governor of Saint Christopher and Nevis from 1980 to 1981.

Early life
Inniss was born in Saint Kitts, where he attended secondary school, and went on to study at the University College of West Indies, graduating in 1961. After working as a schoolteacher for a period, he went to England to study law, eventually being called to the bar as a member of the Middle Temple. He entered the civil service on returning to Saint Kitts, and in June 1967 was made a Member of the Order of the British Empire (MBE) for his work.

Governorship
In August 1975, Inniss succeeded Sir Milton Allen as Governor of Saint Christopher-Nevis-Anguilla, an Associated State of the United Kingdom. In connection with his appointment, he was created a Knight Bachelor in the 1976 New Year Honours, and was personally invested by Queen Elizabeth II in July of the same year. 

During his term in office, there were three changes in government, with Robert Bradshaw, Paul Southwell, Sir Lee Moore, and Sir Kennedy Simmonds all serving as premier at various stages. 

In 1981, Inniss refused assent to a bill that had been passed by the Simmonds government, in the belief that it was unconstitutional. Simmonds consequently wrote to Elizabeth II to request the removal of his commission as governor, which occurred in November of that year.

Later life
After leaving office, Inniss returned to the legal profession, setting up his own firm. He also authored books on the history of Saint Kitts, specifically on the history of Basseterre and of the Saint Kitts and Nevis Labour Party.

References

1936 births
2017 deaths
Knights Bachelor
Governors of British Saint Christopher and Nevis
Members of the Middle Temple
Members of the Order of the British Empire
20th-century Saint Kitts and Nevis lawyers
Alumni of University of London Worldwide
Alumni of the University of London
University of the West Indies alumni
Saint Kitts and Nevis expatriates in the United Kingdom
Governors of Saint Christopher-Nevis-Anguilla
21st-century Saint Kitts and Nevis lawyers